Colours is an album by American jazz saxophonist Sam Rivers featuring Winds of Manhattan, an 11-piece woodwind orchestra. The album was recorded in 1982 for the Italian Black Saint label. The album was composed with some sections of group improvisation. According to participant Steve Coleman, solo improvisations were omitted before the album's release to shorten the track times.

Reception 
The Allmusic review by Ron Wynn awarded the album 3 stars, stating that it had "Stomping, swinging arrangements".

Track listing 
All compositions by Sam Rivers
 "Lilacs" – 5:44
 "Colours" – 5:01
 "Spiral" – 8:36
 "Matrix" – 7:53
 "Revival" – 1:58
 "Blossoms" – 11:24

Personnel 
 Sam Rivers – soprano saxophone, tenor saxophone, flute
Marvin Blackman – soprano saxophone, tenor saxophone, flute
Talib Kibwe – soprano saxophone, tenor saxophone, clarinet, flute
Chris Roberts – soprano saxophone, flute
Steve Coleman, Bobby Watson – alto saxophone, flute
Nat Dixon – tenor saxophone, clarinet, flute
Bill Cody – tenor saxophone, oboe
Eddie Alex – tenor saxophone, piccolo
Jimmy Cozier, Patience Higgins – baritone saxophone, flute

References 

Black Saint/Soul Note albums
Sam Rivers (jazz musician) albums
1983 albums